Ivan III may refer to:

Ivan III Nelipac (died 1434), viceroy of Croatia 
Ivan III of Russia (1440–1505), Grand Duke of Moscow
Ivan III Draskovic (1595 or 1603 – 1648), Croato-Hungarian warrior and statesman, Palatine of Hungary